Introducing or Introducing... may refer to:

Albums
 Introducing (Bombay Rockers album), 2003
 Introducing... The Beatles, 1964
 Introducing... Mari Hamada, 1993
 Introducing...Rubén González, 1997
 Introducing ... Talk Talk, 2003
 Introducing...the Best Of, by Montt Mardié, 2009
 Introducing, by Laura Fygi, 1991

EPs
 Introducing (EP), by Zara Larsson, 2013
 Introducing... Belle & Sebastian, 2008
 Introducing... Ricky Fanté, by Ricky Fanté, 2003

Other uses
 Introducing... (book series), a series of graphic guides to philosophy and science
 BBC Music Introducing, a radio programme
 "and introducing", a designation used for Billing (performing arts)

See also
 
 Introduction (disambiguation)